Radiometer is a Danish multinational company which develops, manufactures and markets solutions for blood sampling, blood gas analysis, transcutaneous monitoring, immunoassay testing and the related IT management systems. The company was founded in 1935 in Copenhagen, Denmark by Børge Aagaard Nielsen and Carl Schrøder. It has over 3,200 employees and direct representation in more than 32 countries. Corporate headquarters remain in Copenhagen.

History
In 1935, engineers, Børge Aagaard Nielsen and Carl Schrøder, founded Radiometer to develop measuring devices for the growing Danish radio industry.

A few years later, Radiometer was contacted by the Carlsberg laboratories and asked to develop an analytical device for the detection of the acid-base (pH) level in liquids. This soon resulted in one of the first commercially available pH meters.

In 1952, as the polio epidemic swept across Europe, many children were at risk of respiratory failure. The head of laboratory, professor Poul Astrup, and anesthesiologist Bjørn Ibsen discovered the right diagnosis by measuring the pH value in blood using Radiometer's pH meters.

This ground-breaking discovery soon formed the basis for Radiometer's entry into medical technology and further innovations within acute care testing.

Today Radiometer's devices are present in 16 of the top 20 hospitals in America as identified in the 2016-2017 U.S. News & World Report Honor Roll of Best Hospitals. Their products are typically used in blood banks, operating rooms, clinics, general practice offices, intensive care units, neonatal intensive care units and pediatric intensive care units.

In 1998 Radiometer acquired Carlsbad, California based SenDx Medical, Inc. SenDx manufactures medical and industrial instruments and blood analysis systems. Later, in 2013, Radiometer acquired Swedish diagnostics company HemoCue AB from Quest Diagnostics. HemoCue develops, produces and markets medical diagnostic products for point-of-care testing like hemoglobin, glucose and others worldwide.

Products & Offerings
The company offers a range of products for:
 Blood Gas Testing
 Neonatal Monitoring
 Immunoassay Testing
 Transcutaneous Monitoring
 Point-of-Care Data Management
 Blood sampling
 Diabetes (via HemoCue)
 Hemoglobin Testing (via HemoCue)
 Quality Control
Its products are covered by over 95 patents and patent applications.

Parent Company & Acquisition
The Danaher Corporation is a US conglomerate headquartered in Washington, D.C. Last year the company landed at #214 on Forbes’ list of largest public companies, boasting 81,000 employees and over $20 billion in revenue. With more than 20 operating companies, Danaher's globally diverse team is united by a common culture and operating system, the Danaher Business System (DBS).

In July 2016 Danaher completed the spin-off of the Fortive Corporation (NYSE: FTV) which comprised its Test & Measurement segment, Industrial Technologies segment and Retail/Commercial Petroleum business. Notable brands such as Fluke, Qualitrol, Tektronix, Gilbarco Veeder-Root, Kollmorgen and Matco Tools were included in the spin-off.

Radiometer was acquired by Danaher in 2004. The Danaher businesses are concentrated in the fields of design, manufacturing, and marketing of industrial and consumer products. It operates in 4 segments: Diagnostics, Environmental & Applied Solutions, Dental and Life Sciences.

Radiometer is one of 6 companies in the Diagnostics segment. The companies within this segment offer a broad range of analytical instruments, reagents, consumables, software and services used to diagnose diseases and make treatment decisions in histopathology labs, hospitals and other critical care settings.

Diagnostics Segment
 Beckman Coulter
 Cepheid
HemoCue
 Leica Biosystems
 Molecular Devices
 Radiometer

Environmental & Applied Solutions
 ALLTEC/FOBA
 ChemTreat
 Esko
 Hach
 LINX
 McCrometer
 Pantone
 Trojan Technologies
 Videojet
 X-Rite

Dental
 Implant Direct
 KaVo
 Kerr
 Nobel Biocare
 Ormco

Life Sciences
 Beckman Coulter Life Sciences
 Leica Microsystems
 Pall
 SCIEX

References

Life science companies based in Copenhagen
Danaher subsidiaries
Companies based in Copenhagen Municipality
Manufacturing companies established in 1935
Danish companies established in 1935